Hungary competed at the 2016 Summer Paralympics in Rio de Janeiro, Brazil, from 7 to 18 September 2016.

Disability classifications

Every participant at the Paralympics has their disability grouped into one of five disability categories; amputation, the condition may be congenital or sustained through injury or illness; cerebral palsy; wheelchair athletes, there is often overlap between this and other categories; visual impairment, including blindness; Les autres, any physical disability that does not fall strictly under one of the other categories, for example dwarfism or multiple sclerosis. Each Paralympic sport then has its own classifications, dependent upon the specific physical demands of competition. Events are given a code, made of numbers and letters, describing the type of event and classification of the athletes competing. Some sports, such as athletics, divide athletes by both the category and severity of their disabilities, other sports, for example swimming, group competitors from different categories together, the only separation being based on the severity of the disability.

Medallists

Cycling

With one pathway for qualification being one highest ranked NPCs on the UCI Para-Cycling male and female Nations Ranking Lists on 31 December 2014, Hungary qualified for the 2016 Summer Paralympics in Rio, assuming they continued to meet all other eligibility requirements.

Judo

With one pathway for qualification being having a top finish at the 2014 IBSA Judo World Championships, Hungary earned a qualifying spot in Rio base on the performance of Nikolett Szabó in the women's -70 kg event.  The B2 Judoka finished first in her class.

Paracanoeing

Germany earned a qualifying spot at the 2016 Summer Paralympics in this sport following their performance at the 2015 ICF Canoe Sprint & Paracanoe World Championships in Milan, Italy where the top six finishers in each Paralympic event earned a qualifying spot for their nation. Anita Váczi earned the spot for Germany after finishing fifth in the women's KL1 event.

Powerlifting

Shooting

The first opportunity to qualify for shooting at the Rio Games took place at the 2014 IPC Shooting World Championships in Suhl. Shooters earned spots for their NPC.  Hungary earned a qualifying spot at this event in the P2 – 10m Air Pistol Women SH1  event as a result of Krisztina Dávid winning a silver medal.

Table tennis

Wheelchair tennis 
Hungary qualified one competitor in the men's single event, Roland Németh. This slot was a result of a Bipartite Commission Invitation place.

See also
Hungary at the 2016 Summer Olympics

References

Nations at the 2016 Summer Paralympics
2016
2016 in Hungarian sport